The 2023 National Lacrosse League season, formally known as the 2022–2023 season, is the 36th in the history of the NLL. The season begins on December 2, 2022, and ends with the NLL final in late spring of 2023. This is the inaugural season for the expansion team Las Vegas Desert Dogs.

The preseason went from November 5 through November 26, 2022. It included games at Aʼnowaraʼko꞉wa Arena and Toronto Rock Athletic Centre. The regular season will go from December 2, 2022 through April 20, 2023. This will have the most number of regular season games in NLL history with 135. The broadcasting partners are TSN in Canada and ESPN in the United States. TSN will feature 20 games on TV with their NLL Game of the Week on TSN and show all the games online and their app. ESPN will air 10 games on TV and all games on ESPN+.

This is the first season for Commissioner Brett Frood, who was previously a NASCAR executive as president of the Stewart-Haas Racing team. Frood was a collegiate lacrosse player and was captain of the Brown University lacrosse team.

The 2023 NLL Stadium Showdown, the first outdoor NLL game, will be held on March 4 at the Snapdragon Stadium, between the San Diego Seals and the Las Vegas Desert Dogs.

Regular season

Awards

Annual awards

Stadiums and locations

Attendance

See also
 2023 in sports

References

National Lacrosse League
National Lacrosse League seasons